Alsager School (formerly known as Alsager Comprehensive School) is a coeducational secondary school and sixth form with academy status, located in Alsager in the English county of Cheshire.

Location
Alsager School is situated opposite the former Manchester Metropolitan University Alsager campus (former Cheshire County Training College), which is now a housing estate, and next to both Christ Church, Alsager and Alsager Leisure Centre. It is attended by over 1300 pupils from the local area.

History
In September 2009 Alsager School became a Foundation School as it joined the Alsager Community Trust.

In September 2011, Richard Middlebrook replaced David Black as Headteacher.

The school converted to academy status in September 2013 and became part of the Alsager Multi Academy Trust (AMAT).

As of Easter 2018, Weston Village Primary School became part of AMAT.

In September 2020, Alsager Highfields Community Primary School joined AMAT.

Academic performance
The school gets results above the England average at GCSE and the eighth best in Cheshire. At A level it gets results above the England average. Following the February 2016 Ofsted inspection, it was rated Outstanding, point four on a four-point scale.

Notable former pupils
 Professor David Bailey, economist and commentator
 Mark Cueto, England international rugby player
 Lee Bell, footballer
 Shaun Miller, footballer
 Luke Murphy, footballer
 Wes Nelson, love island
 Kate Rooney, Olympic pole vaulter

References

External links
 Alsager School - Website

Secondary schools in the Borough of Cheshire East
Academies in the Borough of Cheshire East